Carlos Nobre may refer to:
 Carlos Nobre (rugby union)
 Carlos Nobre (scientist)